{{Infobox airport 
| name                = Hoarafushi Airport
| nativename-a        =  ހޯރަފުށި އެއާޕޯޓް
| image               = Hoarafushi Airport.jpg
| image-width         = 250
| IATA                = HRF
| ICAO                = VRAH
| type                = Public
| owner               = MACL
| operator            = Regional Airports Company Limited
| city-served         = Hoarafushi (Haa Alif Atoll),  Haa Alif Atoll, Maldives
| location            = HA. Hoarafushi
| metric-elev         = y
| elevation-m         = 2
| elevation-f         =
| coordinates         = 
| website             = macl.aero
| pushpin_map         = Maldives
| pushpin_relief      = yes
| pushpin_mapsize     = 105
| pushpin_map_caption = Location in Maldives
| pushpin_label       = Hoarafushi Airport''
| mapframe            = yes
| metric-rwy          = y
| r1-number           = 06/24
| r1-length-m         = 1,200
| r1-surface          = Asphalt
| footnotes           = Sources: IATA
}}Hoarafushi Airport''' is a domestic airport located on Hoarafushi (Haa Alif Atoll), one of the islands of the Haa Alif Atoll in Maldives. A test flight landed at Hoarafushi Airport on 16 November 2020. Maldives Transport and Contracting Company (MTCC) was contracted the MVR 198 million project in March 2019 to develop the airport terminal and fire building.

Airlines and destinations 
The airport currently only serves one commercial destination.

See also
List of airports in the Maldives
List of airlines of the Maldives

References

Airports in the Maldives
Airports established in 2019